Warszawa Ursus Niedźwiadek railway station is a railway station in the Ursus district of Warsaw, Poland.  The station is served by Koleje Mazowieckie, who run trains from Skierniewice to Warszawa Wschodnia, and Szybka Kolej Miejska, who run trains from Pruszków PKP to Otwock.

References

External links 
 
Station article at kolej.one.pl

Railway stations in Poland opened in 1926
Ursus
Railway stations served by Koleje Mazowieckie
Railway stations served by Szybka Kolej Miejska (Warsaw)
Ursus, Warsaw